The 2006 CAF Confederation Cup was the third edition of the CAF Confederation Cup. It started with the preliminary round (home-and away ties) that was played in February and March 2006. Étoile Sahel of Tunisia beat FAR Rabat of Morocco in the final. The final was marred by a skirmish when FAR Rabat attacked the referee and his linesman after having a late goal ruled out.

Pre Cup Events

Before the cup,  Morocco and South Africa offered to host the cup. Due to the uncertainty of hosting the cup in African terrain where there were ongoing conflicts at the time they did not host the cup.

Qualifying rounds

Preliminary round
1st legs played 17–19 February 2006 and 2nd legs played 3–5 March 2006.

|}
1 ASC Entente and Bakau United FC withdrew. 
2 The tie between Ferroviário da Beira and Élan Club was played over one leg only by mutual consent.

3 Moro United were drawn against the representatives of Zimbabwe, but the Zimbabwean FA were unable to send a team as their cup winners and league runners-up, Masvingo United, were suspended from CAF competition.

First round
1st legs played 17–19 March 2006 and 2nd legs played 31 March -2 April 2006.

|}
1 TP Mazembe was disqualified for showing up late for the 1st leg due to transportation problems.

Second round
1st legs played 21–23 April 2006 and 2nd legs played 5–7 May 2006.

|}

Play-off round
The 8 winners of the round of 16 play the losers of the round of 16 of the Champions League for 8 places in the group stage.
1st legs played 14-July 16, 2006 and 2nd legs played 28-July 30, 2006.

|}

Group stage

The Group Stage matches were played between August and October 2006.

Group A

Group B

Knockout stage

Final

The 1st leg was played on November 18 and the 2nd leg on December 2.

Étoile du Sahel won on away goal after 1–1 on aggregate.

Top goalscorers

The top scorers from the 2006 CAF Confederation Cup are as follows:

References

External links 
Official Site
Confederation Cup 2006 - rsssf.com

 
CAF Confederation Cup
2006 in African football